PJSC Kazanorgsintez is one of Russia's largest chemical companies and the country's largest polyethylene producer. It is based in Kazan, Tatarstan.

Overview 
The company produces a range of organic chemistry products including ethylene, polyethylene, ethylene oxide, phenol, acetone, and polyethylene pipes. Kazanorgsintez also offers glycols, ethanolamines, cooling liquids, and textile agents and products for primary preparation of oil–corrosion and paraffin deposits inhibitors, proxanols-proxamines, and demulsifiers. About 25% of the company's production is exported to other countries.

The history of the company dates back to the 1950s, when it was founded as Kazan Chemical Plant. Production began in 1959. Kazanorgsintez currently has about 8,323 employees and its stock is listed in the Russian trading system.

Investment company Svyazinvestneftekhim is a shareholder in Kazanorgsintez. In 2016, Svyazinvestneftekhim transferred a 16.09 percent stake in Kazanorgsintez to AK BARS Bank to increase its capitalization.

References

External links 
Company website

Companies based in Kazan
Chemical companies of Russia
Chemical companies of the Soviet Union
Companies listed on the Moscow Exchange